The Franklin O-350 (company designation 6A-350) was an American air-cooled aircraft engine of the 1960s. The engine was of six-cylinder, horizontally-opposed layout and displaced . The 6V-350 was a vertically mounted, fan cooled version for helicopters.

Variants
6A-350 at 3,200 rpm

6A-350C1 at 2,800 rpm 
6A-350C1R at 2,800 rpm 
6A-350C1L at 2,800 rpm 

6AS-350Turbocharged,  at 2,800 rpm

6V-350Vertically mounted, fan-cooled helicopter version,  at 3,200 rpm

Applications
Bushcaddy L-164
Cessna 170
Cessna 172
Cessna 175
Hirth Acrostar
Jovair Sedan
Kaiser Magic
Maule M-4
Maule M-5
Procaer Picchio
PZL M-20 Mewa
Rallye Commodore
SIAI-Marchetti S.205
SIAI-Marchetti SH-4
Stinson 108
Van's RV-8
Zenith STOL CH 801

Specifications (6A-350)

See also

References

Notes

Bibliography

 Gunston, Bill. (1986) World Encyclopedia of Aero Engines. Patrick Stephens: Wellingborough. p. 57

Franklin aircraft engines
1960s aircraft piston engines
Boxer engines